San Andrés Tenejapan is a municipality located in the montane central zone of the State of Veracruz, about 85 km from state capital Xalapa. It has a surface of 24.68 km2.

Geographic Limits

The municipality of San Andrés Tenejapan is delimited to the north by Tlilapan and Rafael Delgado to the east by Rafael Delgado, Rafael Delgado y Tlilapan,  to the south by Tequila and Atlahuilco and to the west by Huiloapan de Cuauhtémoc.  It is watered by small rivers, which are tributaries of the Río Blanco.

Agriculture

It produces principally maize.

Celebrations

In  San Andrés Tenejapan , in February takes place the celebration in honor to Virgen de la Candelaria, Patron of the town, and in December takes place the celebration in honor to Virgen de Guadalupe.

Weather

The weather in  San Andrés Tenejapan  is cold and wet all year with rains in summer and autumn.

References

External links 

  Municipal Official webpage
  Municipal Official Information

Municipalities of Veracruz